Gakhwasan is a mountain of Gyeongsangbuk-do, eastern South Korea. It has an elevation of 1,177 metres.

See also
List of mountains of Korea

References

Bonghwa County
Mountains of North Gyeongsang Province
Mountains of South Korea
One-thousanders of South Korea